Molly Hatchet is an American rock band formed in 1971 by guitarist Dave Hlubek in Jacksonville, Florida. They were a popular band during the late 1970s and early to mid-1980s among the southern rock and hard rock communities. The band released six studio albums on Epic Records between 1978 and 1984, including the platinum-selling hit records Molly Hatchet (1978), Flirtin' with Disaster (1979), and Beatin' the Odds (1980). They also had successful hits on the Billboard charts, including "Flirtin' with Disaster", "The Rambler", "Bloody Reunion" and "Satisfied Man". Molly Hatchet has released eight more studio albums since their split with Epic in 1985, although none of them have been as successful as their early albums, nor charted in the United States.

All of the band's founding members, the ones who played on the band's first album, have died. Current keyboardist John Galvin has been a member of Molly Hatchet since 1984 (with the exception of a break between 1991 and 1994) and Bobby Ingram has been their guitarist since 1987, when he replaced founding member Dave Hlubek, who rejoined the band 18 years later and stayed with the band until his death in 2017. Also included in the current lineup are drummer Shawn Beamer, bassist Tim Lindsey and vocalist Jimmy Elkins.

History

Early years, commercial success, and Danny Joe Brown's first departure (1971–1980)
Molly Hatchet was founded by guitarist Dave Hlubek in 1971. The band originated and was based in Jacksonville, Florida, and shared influences and inspiration with what is perhaps the most well-known act in the Southern rock genre, Lynyrd Skynyrd.

The producer on their first record, Tom Werman, known for working with straight rock music acts such as Cheap Trick and Ted Nugent, combined boogie, blues, and hard rock.

The band released their first album, Molly Hatchet, in September 1978, supported by "Dreams I'll Never See" (a cover of the Allman Brothers Band 1969 track "Dreams"), which got AOR airplay. The album was followed a year later by Flirtin' with Disaster, with its title song another AOR hit, as was its first track, "Whiskey Man", from the album. Molly Hatchet proceeded to tour behind both records and expanded their fan base, appearing at theaters, arenas, and stadiums with the likes of AC/DC, Aerosmith, The Babys, The Charlie Daniels Band, Cheap Trick, Def Leppard, Journey, Judas Priest, Eddie Money, The Outlaws, REO Speedwagon, Rush, Santana, Scorpions, Bob Seger, Thin Lizzy, .38 Special, Pat Travers, UFO, and The Who.

Lead singer Danny Joe Brown left the band in May 1980 due to diabetes and other reasons, only to return two years later. After Brown left Molly Hatchet, he formed the Danny Joe Brown Band.

Continued popularity, member changes, and split with Epic (1980–1988)
Brown was replaced in 1980 in Molly Hatchet by vocalist Jimmy Farrar, a native of LaGrange, Georgia. The earlier albums seemed to some commentators to exhibit a distinct southern cultural influence; that sound changed with the addition of Farrar. Danny Joe Brown's stage persona, gruff voice, and cowboy horse-whistling was replaced by Jimmy Farrar's new vocal style, mixed with a new, harder-rocking sound. With the success of the next album, Beatin' the Odds, released September 1980, the band ventured away from the Southern rock sound of their first albums. Nonetheless, Molly Hatchet toured successfully in support of Beatin' the Odds, opening for bands such as Blue Öyster Cult, AC/DC, and The Outlaws, as well as headlining their own tour that was supported by the Michael Schenker Group and the Johnny Van Zant Band.

By 1981, Molly Hatchet had evolved to a straight-ahead rock style and a slicker production, as exhibited on Take No Prisoners (November 1981). The band remained a successful act on the touring circuit.

Longtime bass player Banner Thomas left in November 1981 and was replaced by Riff West. In the following year, drummer B. B. Borden (also known as B. B. Queen as a member of the funk rock band Mother's Finest) replaced Crump, who had moved to Los Angeles. Farrar then left the group to make way for Brown's return. He later rejoined other members of Molly Hatchet in Southern Rock Allstars and Gator Country. Brown rejoined the band in May 1982 after the departure of Farrar.

In March 1983, the line-up of Brown, Hlubek, Holland, Roland, West, and Borden released the band's fifth album No Guts...No Glory. While touring for the album during the summer of 1983, Hatchet was touring with fellow Jacksonville natives Blackfoot. Just before a gig at Memorial Hall in Kansas City, Kansas, though, Brown, Holland, and Roland decided to leave and return home, leaving only Hlubek, West, and Borden to play the show. After a quick rehearsal backstage, Blackfoot's Rickey Medlocke took Brown's place as front man and their other guitarist, Charlie Hargrett, played behind Hlubek's lead. Danny and the other members of Molly Hatchet rejoined the tour the next day, but Holland decided to leave the band once again in 1984 and was replaced by former Danny Joe Brown Band keyboardist John Galvin.

In November 1984, the album The Deed Is Done was released, which was more of a straightforward pop/rock offering, with Bruce Crump returning on drums.

November 1985 had the unveiling of the band's double live album Double Trouble Live, after which the band was dropped by Epic. They retained Brown and their Southern rock style.

Guitarist/founder Hlubek, who later admitted to suffering from drug troubles, left Molly Hatchet in January 1987. He was replaced by Bobby Ingram, who had contributed backup vocals to Double Trouble, had played as a guitarist in the Danny Joe Brown Band, and had also played earlier with Brown in Rum Creek.

Years of turmoil and more lineup changes (1989–2004)
Molly Hatchet's first studio album in five years, and only release on Capitol Records, Lightning Strikes Twice was released in 1989, and it was their first one not to appear on the charts. One of its singles, "There Goes the Neighborhood", did, however, enter the top 30 on the Hot Mainstream Rock Tracks chart. The band went on a year-long tour to support the album, playing smaller venues such as clubs and theaters, as opposed to the stadiums and arenas that had expanded their popularity. On July 8, 1990, Molly Hatchet, which had been dropped by Capitol after the commercial failure of Lighting Strikes Twice, announced at a show in Toledo, Ohio, that the concert would be their final one; after that night, the band would be disbanding.

A greatest hits collection released by Epic, Greatest Hits, featuring two newly recorded songs, was released in the fall of 1990, with sales reaching gold status.

In late 1990, a revised band led by Brown and Ingram featured new players Rik Blanz (guitar), Rob Scavetto (keyboards), Eddie Rio (bass), and David Feagle (drums), but the Hatchet's lineup in the 1990s was a bit of a revolving door. Rio was replaced in 1991 by Rob Sweat and then Kevin Rian. Feagle was succeeded the same year by drummer Kenny Holton. Blanz left in mid-1991, replaced by Erik Lundgren. Touring member  (guitar) Phil McCormack stood in for Brown briefly in early 1992, and by 1993, the lineup was: Brown, Ingram, Lundgren, Mac Crawford (drums), and a returning Banner Thomas (bass), with Mike Kach (keyboards), who was replaced in 1994 by Andy Orth. Bryan Bassett (ex-Wild Cherry) took over as second guitarist in 1994 and Buzzy Meekins (formerly of the Outlaws and Danny Joe Brown Band) was bassist after Banner left again in 1995.

During the first half of the 1990s, Molly Hatchet played selected shows and tours, but did not record again until 1995, when they began working on a new studio album with German producer Kalle Trapp.

In April 1995, after continuing health problems, Brown had to once again leave the band and Jimmy Farrar was brought back for a few weeks to front the group and help "legitimize" the current version. The crowd reaction to Farrar being back was not overly positive, though, so Ingram and Brown together made the decision to bring back Brown's 1992 stand-in, Phil McCormack, as the permanent replacement. McCormack fronted the band for their next album Devil's Canyon (June 1996).

During the rest of the 1990s, the band's line-up did not feature any of the members who had performed in Molly Hatchet prior to 1984. Bobby Ingram leased, then obtained in 2000, the trademark ownership to work with the name. At this point, the band consisted of vocalist Phil McCormack, guitarists Bobby Ingram and Bryan Bassett, returning keyboardist John Galvin, bassist Andy McKinney, and drummer Mac Crawford. This line-up recorded the album Silent Reign of Heroes (June 1998).

In 1997, keyboardist Tim Donovan began filling in for Galvin on the road and Sean Shannon became the group's new drummer in 1998 after Crawford left. In 1999, the band traveled coast to coast with Charlie Daniels and the Volunteer Jam.

Former Hatchet singer Danny Joe Brown, despite a long battle with diabetes and the effects of a stroke, was able to take the stage one last time at the Jammin' for DJB benefit concert organized by former Hatchet bassist Riff West on July 18, 1999, at Orlando, Florida's Club LaVela. With the help of his friends and former members Bruce Crump, Banner Thomas, Steve Holland, and Dave Hlubek, he ended the show with "Flirtin' with Disaster".

In June 2000, Bobby Ingram became the sole owner of the trade and service mark "Molly Hatchet", acquired from original member Duane Roland. Also in 2000, Kingdom of XII was recorded and released in Europe, and the band then toured Europe to promote the album. It was released in the United States in June 2001. After the recording of Kingdom, guitarist Russ Maxwell came aboard after Bassett left the group to rejoin Foghat, then Shawn Beamer (from Southern Rock Rebellion) replaced Sean Shannon in the fall of 2001. Bassist Jerry Scott (formerly with Brian Howe's band) joined in early 2002 after McKinney departed.

That same year, Ingram took a short break from touring after suffering a heart attack, and the band continued with only Maxwell on guitar.

Locked and Loaded (a live recording from 2000) was released in March 2003 and 25th Anniversary: Best of Re-Recorded followed in January 2004.

John Galvin, though he continued to appear on the band's albums, was again not touring with the band in the 2000s (except for a short European tour in December 2001). Tim Donovan (1997-2002), Scott Woods (2002), Jeff Ravenscraft (2003-2004), Gary Corbett (2004), and Richie Del Favero (2004-2005) played live keyboards until 2005, after which the group dispensed with having a touring keyboardist for a while.

Bassist Jerry Scott was replaced by J.J. Strickland in May 2003, by Tim Lindsey, former Lynyrd Skynyrd, the Rossington Band, Artimus Pyle Band, and the Mind Garden (with Dave Hlubek) bassist coming full circle back to his roots, took over in June 2003.

Return of Dave Hlubek (2005–2013)

Warriors of the Rainbow Bridge (May 2005) featured the return of Hlubek after Rutter had left, but another guitarist, Jimbo Manion, played alongside Ingram until Hlubek had satisfied his other commitments and was able to return full time later that year.

Danny Joe Brown died on March 10, 2005, at his home in Davie, Florida. He was 53. The cause was kidney failure. On June 19, 2006, guitarist Duane Roland died at his home in St. Augustine, Florida, at the age of 53. His death was listed as being of "natural causes" according to a June 25, 2006, obituary in The Boston Globe.

During the spring of 2006, David "Dino" Ramsey sat in for singer McCormack, who had taken ill.

The band's Southern Rock Masters (April 2008) was an album of classic rock covers and was released again in a slightly realtered form as Regrinding the Axes (June 2012).

In 2008, keyboardist John Galvin returned to the live stage again after Hlubek's recurring health issues prevented him from appearing at all of the band's gigs.

Their studio album, Justice (June 2010), was recorded in Germany in 2010 on SPV Records, GmbH.

In 2011, drummer Shawn Beamer had a heart attack and a temporary drummer Scott Craig was brought in. In 2013, Beamer returned to the band.

Deaths of former members and continued career (2014–present)
 Bass guitarist Riff West died on November 19, 2014, at age 64, after a lengthy illness caused by severe injuries suffered in a car accident. 
 Drummer Bruce Crump died on March 16, 2015, at age 57, from complications after a 12-year battle with throat cancer.
 Bass guitarist Banner Thomas, age 62, died from complications of pneumonia and rheumatoid arthritis on April 10, 2017. 
 Dave Hlubek died of a heart attack on September 2, 2017, at the age of 66. 
 Jimmy Farrar, who was frontman from 1980 to 1982, died of heart failure on October 29, 2018, at 67. 
 Singer Phil McCormack died on April 26, 2019, at 58. McCormack had been sidelined in early 2019, after suffering from health troubles that affected his voice. He was replaced by singer Jimmy Elkins, who continued on with Hatchet after McCormack's death. 
 Steve Holland, who was the guitarist of Molly Hatchet from 1971 to 1984, died on August 2, 2020, of pnuemonia as a complication of COVID-19 at age 66.

Despite having no original members left, Molly Hatchet continues to perform live as of 2022, and their current lineup features half of the Lightning Strikes Twice–era lineup (keyboardist John Galvin and guitarist Bobby Ingram) and drummer Shawn Beamer, bassist Tim Lindsey, and vocalist Jimmy Elkins, who replaced McCormack in 2019. In June 2022, Ingram reported to the Creston News Advertiser that a new Molly Hatchet album is in the works and intended for a late 2023 release.

Name and iconic cover art
Molly Hatchet took its name from a prostitute who allegedly mutilated and decapitated her clients. One iconic aspect of Molly Hatchet's image is that many of the band's album covers feature art inspired by heroic fantasy, several of which were painted by artists such as Frank Frazetta, Boris Vallejo, and Paul R. Gregory.

Members

Current members
John Galvin – keyboards, synthesizers, piano, programming, backing vocals 
Bobby Ingram – lead, acoustic and slide guitars, backing vocals 
Shawn Beamer – drums, percussion 
Tim Lindsey – bass, backing vocals 
Jimmy Elkins – lead vocals

Discography

Studio albums

Live albums

Compilations

Singles

Radio shows
 Molly Hatchet Innerview (1978)
 Molly Hatchet: Climax Blues Band BBC (1979) (Reading Festival)
 Molly Hatchet - 38 Special KBFH (1980)
 Molly Hatchet Innerview (1981)
 Molly Hatchet Best of the Biscuit KBFH (1981)
 Molly Hatchet KBFH   (1982)
 Molly Hatchet in Concert 1  (1982)
 Molly Hatchet in Concert 2  (1983)
 Molly Hatchet Captured Live (1984)
 Molly Hatchet in Concert 3  (1984)
 Molly Hatchet: Marshall Tucker in Concert (1996)

References

External links

 

Southern rock musical groups from Jacksonville
Hard rock musical groups from Florida
Musical groups established in 1975
1971 establishments in Florida
Jam bands
American blues rock musical groups